The jaguar catfish (Liosomadorsa oncinus) is a species of driftwood catfish endemic to Brazil where it is found in the Branco River.  It is also found in the aquarium trade.

References

 

Auchenipteridae
Fish described in 1841
Endemic fauna of Brazil